Bertha Marian Holt (February 5, 1904 – 2000) founded the Holt International Children's Services organization and fought to have the law changed in America to allow for more than two international adoptions.

Background
Bertha Marian Holt was born on February 5, 1904, in Des Moines, Iowa to Clifford and Eva Holt. Her father was a school teacher and a mail carrier. She received her nursing degree in 1926 and married a cousin, Harry Holt, on December 31, 1927. They moved to South Dakota where they were “custom farmers” which meant they worked the land owned by others until they could save for their own land. During the Depression, they had to leave their farm and move to Willamette Valley in Oregon. They prospered in Oregon, eventually owning a lumber mill.

Adoptions
In 1954, Bertha, a nurse, and her husband, a farmer, and lumberjack, went to a high school auditorium in Eugene, Oregon, to watch a film about children in Amerasian South Korean orphanages. The Holts started to send money to South Korean orphanages but soon decided to do more. They both wanted to adopt eight children but kept this idea to themselves because they figured the other spouse would think this was too many. Federal law at the time didn't allow any family to adopt more than two foreign born children.

In 1955, Congress passed the Bill for Relief of Certain War Orphans, specifically so that the Holt family could adopt eight children. They adopted four boys and four girls ranging in age from babies to three and a half.

Agency creation
In 1956, the Holts founded the Holt International Children's Services. There was no system in place at the time for international adoptions. Grandma Holt, as she was known, continued to be active in the agency until the day she died.

While in South Korea in 1964, Harry Holt had a heart attack and died. Many believed the agency would close, but Mrs. Holt took over and traveled tirelessly. She worked to improve conditions at the Il San Center in Korea where the Holts built an orphanage and she lobbied other countries to set up adoption programs.

Family life
The Holts children include Molly Holt, Barbara Chambers, Suzanne Peterson, Linda Pack, Robert Holt, Mary Last, Christine Russell, Helen Stampe, Nat Holt, Paul Holt, and Betty Blankenship. She had three sisters, Beulah Stronczek, Katherine Stanger and Grace Fisher; a brother, William L. Holt; 19 grandchildren, and 12 great-grandchildren at the time of her death.

Awards

2002, induction into the National Women's Hall of Fame

Death
Bertha died at the age of 96 in the year 2000 at her home in Creswell, Oregon.

Books
The Seed From The East by Bertha Holt and David Wisner
Bring My Sons From Afar: The unfolding of Harry Holt's dream by Bertha Holt
Created for God's Glory by Bertha Holt

References

External links
The Legacy of Bertha "Grandma" Holt, Holt International

1904 births
2000 deaths
American nurses
American women nurses
People from Des Moines, Iowa
People from Creswell, Oregon
20th-century American women
20th-century American people